Helen Losee Wagner (September 3, 1918 – May 1, 2010) was an Emmy award winning American actress.

Born in Lubbock, Texas, she is best known for her long-running role as Nancy Hughes McClosky on the soap opera As the World Turns. After appearing in the soap opera for some 50 years, at the time of her death she was the longest serving actor on an American soap opera. She played the role of Trudy Bauer during the initial TV years of Guiding Light in the early 1950s. She appeared on the early soap Valiant Lady, as well as on primetime programs including The World of Mr. Sweeney, Mister Peepers, Inner Sanctum, and the Philco-Goodyear Playhouse.

Biography
Helen Losee Wagner was born on September 3, 1918, in Lubbock, Texas,  one of two daughters of Charles and Janette (née Tinker) Wagner. She studied music and drama at Monmouth College in Illinois where she graduated with a Bachelor of Arts degree in 1938.

Before signing a 13-week contract for As the World Turns in 1956, Wagner had been a singer and stage actress, sometimes working as a church soloist to pay the rent. She had roles in the stage plays Sunny River, Oklahoma! and The Bad Seed on Broadway.

In 1954, she married Robert Willey, an actor and theater producer. He died in 2009. Wagner died of cancer on May 1, 2010, at the age of 91.

As the World Turns
Wagner played the soap opera's matriarch, Nancy Hughes, from its debut on April 2, 1956, until her death. She was acknowledged in Guinness World Records for having the longest run in a single role on television, a position she held until 2010.

In fact, Wagner spoke the show's very first line, "Good morning, dear," and would witness its many broadcast transformations. As The World Turns premiered as a 30-minute program and was the first soap opera, along with The Edge of Night, to do so. Up until that time, all soaps ran for only 15 minutes. Advertisers were skeptical at first, finding it hard to believe that the average housewife had the attention span to tune to one soap opera for a half-hour. The show would hit ratings gold within three years. It would eventually expand to a full hour.

On November 22, 1963, Wagner inadvertently became part of broadcast history. About ten minutes into that day's episode of As the World Turns, a scene featuring her character was interrupted by Walter Cronkite's first news bulletin that President John F. Kennedy had been shot in Dallas (this bulletin was audio only, as the studio camera was not ready until 20 minutes later). Wagner later remembered that she and actor Santos Ortega, who played Grandpa Hughes, continued with the scene as it was broadcast live, unaware of the unfolding tragedy until they were told about it during a commercial break.

Wagner took some breaks from the role, both voluntary and involuntary. After six months with the show, creator Irna Phillips fired her because she did not favor the way Wagner poured coffee. After overwhelming pressure to hire her back, Phillips did so begrudgingly. Wagner would leave of her own accord in the early 1980s. Dissatisfied with then-producer Mary-Ellis Bunim's decision to showcase the Hughes family less, Wagner and co-star Don MacLaughlin walked away from the show after vocal dissent in the press. With As The World Turns having fallen from the top spot in the Nielsen TV ratings, Bunim wanted to shift the show's focus to the younger generation. Wagner eventually returned to the role in 1985 and in 1986 she and an ailing MacLaughlin, who played her on-screen husband, were prominently featured in the show's 30th anniversary episode. The storyline had their characters celebrating their 50th wedding anniversary.

After McLaughlin's death in 1986, the Nancy Hughes character became a widow. She later met and married Dan McClosky (Dan Frazer) and was subsequently part of a storyline in which Dan was diagnosed with Alzheimer's disease. After it culminated in Dan's death, Wagner faced many years with little to no part in the story. She returned to the screen with a pivotal role in a 2004 storyline revolving around her grandson's marriage to naïve teenager Alison Stewart (played by Jessica Dunphy). In 2005, 2006, and 2007, Wagner averaged around three appearances a month on the serial. She was prominently featured in the show's 50th anniversary episode in April 2006.

Her lack of screen time was attributed by some to the failing health of her real-life husband, Robert Willey. But press reports later stated that show producer Procter & Gamble had actually taken Wagner off contract and only used her on special occasions. Fans were vocal in their displeasure with Wagner's lack of story. When asked how long she would keep playing Nancy, Wagner replied  "As long as I can and they want me." After a prolonged absence, Nancy returned to the screen on November 25, 2009 for the show's Thanksgiving episode and also on December 29, 2009. She appeared again on April 2 and April 5, 2010. Her final appearance on As the World Turns, taped in March, aired on June 1, 2010 — exactly a month after her death. Wagner's death was finally addressed in episodes broadcast on August 30 and 31, 2010. On August 30, Nancy's son Bob Hughes discovers that his mother has died quietly in her apartment. In the following episode, family and friends remember Nancy, with numerous flashbacks to scenes from vintage episodes.

Wagner's death from undisclosed causes came less than two months before As The World Turns taped its final episode. CBS announced on December 9, 2009, that it was cancelling the show after 54 years on the air. Many fans had hoped that Wagner would be able to close the series with the line "Good night, dear," just as she had uttered "Good morning, dear" as the first line of the program back in 1956. The last episode was taped on June 23, 2010, and aired on September 17, 2010. She was presented with a "Lifetime Achievement" Emmy in May 2004.

Alma mater
In 1988, Wagner's alma mater, Monmouth College (Illinois), awarded her an honorary degree of "Doctor of Humane Letters". The following year, Wagner chaired a national committee that raised more than $1 million to replace the school's "little theater" with a state-of-the-art facility. On opening night in Monmouth's new Wells Theater, Wagner played the role of Eleanor in The Lion in Winter.

References

External links

 

1918 births
2010 deaths
20th-century American actresses
21st-century American actresses
American soap opera actresses
American television actresses
American radio actresses
Actresses from Texas
Deaths from cancer in New York (state)
Monmouth College alumni
People from Lubbock, Texas